William Whetton is a New Zealand rugby union player. He currently plays at number 8 for Castres in the Top 14. He is the son of ex-All Black lock Gary Whetton and his brother Jack is also a professional rugby player.

References

External links
Ligue Nationale De Rugby Profile (in French)
European Professional Club Rugby Profile

Living people
1989 births
New Zealand rugby union players
New Zealand expatriate rugby union players
New Zealand expatriate sportspeople in France
Expatriate rugby union players in France
Northland rugby union players
North Harbour rugby union players
Castres Olympique players
CA Brive players
Rugby union number eights